Emmanuelle Gagliardi and Tina Pisnik were the defending champions, but Pisnik did not compete this year. Gagliardi teamed up with Mariana Díaz Oliva and lost in first round to María José Argeri and Letícia Sobral.

Gisela Dulko and Flavia Pennetta won the title by defeating Ágnes Szávay and Jasmin Wöhr 7–6(7–1), 6–1 in the final.

Seeds

Draw

Draw

References
 Official results archive (ITF)
 Official results archive (WTA)

Copa Colsanitas Seguros Bolivar - Doubles
2006 Doubles